LLR Recordings (previously Little League Records 1998-2001) was a Chicago-based record label founded by Johnny Minardi and Tony Marino in August 2001. The label released records including the debut EP of The Academy Is..., the Remember Maine album The Last Place You Look, and the Hidden In Plain View EP Operation: Cut-Throat.

The company announced their closure following Minardi's move to work for Fueled by Ramen via a message on their website in 2005 stating "Goodnight sweet prince".

Discography

References

American record labels
Record labels established in 1998